Historia verdadera de la conquista de la Nueva España (The True History of the Conquest of New Spain) is a first-person narrative written in 1568  by military adventurer, conquistador, and colonist settler Bernal Díaz del Castillo (1492–1584), who served in three Mexican expeditions; those of Francisco Hernández de Córdoba (1517) to the Yucatán peninsula; the expedition of Juan de Grijalva (1518), and the expedition of Hernán Cortés (1519) in the Valley of Mexico; the history relates his participation in the fall of Emperor Moctezuma II, and the subsequent defeat of the Aztec Empire.

In the colonial history of Latin America, it is a military account which historian J.M. Cohen states that Bernal Díaz del Castillo is “among chroniclers what Daniel Defoe is among novelists”. Late in life, when Díaz del Castillo was in his 60s, he finished his first-person account of the Spanish conquest of the West Indies and the Aztec Empire. He wrote The True History of the Conquest of New Spain to defend the story of the common-soldier conquistador within the histories about the Spanish conquest of the Aztec Empire. He presents his narrative as an alternative to the critical writings of Bartolomé de Las Casas whose descriptions of Spanish treatment of native peoples emphasized the cruelty of the conquest. He also criticized the histories of the  hagiographic biographers of Hernán Cortés, specifically that of Francisco López de Gómara who Díaz del Castillo believed minimized the role of the 700 enlisted soldiers instrumental to conquering the Aztec Empire. In his eyewitness account, narrated in the first-person plural "we," Díaz del Castillo strongly defends the actions of the conquistadors while emphasizing their humanity and honesty. He summarizes their actions by saying, "We went there to serve God, and also to get rich."

The history is occasionally uncharitable about Cortés; like other professional soldiers who participated in the Conquest of New Spain, Díaz del Castillo found himself among the ruins of Tenochtitlán only slightly wealthier than when he arrived to Mexico. The land and gold compensation paid to many of the conquistadores proved a poor return for their investment of months of soldiering and fighting across Mexico and the Anahuac Valley.

Unabridged Translations
 The True History of the Conquest of Mexico by Captain Bernal Diaz del Castillo, translated by Maurice Keatinge, London, 1800
The Memoirs of the Conquistador Bernal Díaz del Castillo (1844), translated from the Spanish by John Ingram Lockhart (writer) (2 volumes, 213 chapters with notes)
 The True History of the Conquest of New Spain by Captain Bernal Díaz del Castillo, translated by Alfred Percival Maudslay. London 1908 Hakluyt Society (4 Volumes, 17 Parts, 214 chapters with Appendices) from the only original copy published by Genaro García in Mexico with notes and appendices - considered the most complete and authentic translation Volume 1, volume 2 and 3, Volume 4, and Volume 5. An Abridged version with deleted passages and 116 chapters was published in 1928,titled . The History and the Conquest of Mexico 1517-1521

Notes

References

External links 
 Historia verdadera de la conquista de la Nueva España. Tomo I, facsimile of 1939 edition, with introduction and notes by Joaquín Ramírez Cabañas, published Mexico City by Pedro Robredo; reproduced online at the Biblioteca Virtual Miguel de Cervantes (Alicante, Spain, 2005) 
 Historia verdadera de la conquista de la Nueva España, online reproduction by Biblioteca Virtual Antorcha, based on the 1961 Fernández Editores edition, published Mexico City  
 

History of Mexico
History of New Spain
Spanish-language literature about Mesoamerica
16th-century history books
History books about the 16th  century
1632 books
1632 in New Spain
History of the Aztecs
Colonial Mexico
Encomenderos
1510s in the Aztec civilization
1520s in the Aztec civilization
1510s in New Spain
1520s in New Spain
Spanish conquests in the Americas
Spanish colonization of the Americas